Brothers by Blood (originally known as The Sound of Philadelphia) is a 2020 crime drama film written, directed, and produced by Jeremie Guez, based on the 1991 novel Brotherly Love by Pete Dexter. It stars Matthias Schoenaerts, Joel Kinnaman, Maika Monroe, Paul Schneider, Nicholas Crovetti and Ryan Phillippe.

The film had its world premiere at the Deauville Film Festival on September 8, 2020. It was released on January 22, 2021, by Vertical Entertainment.

Plot

A man remains tormented by his sister's death, while his cousin grows more powerful in the hierarchy of the family crime business.

Cast
 Matthias Schoenaerts as Peter Flood
 Nicholas Crovetti as Young Peter Flood
 Joel Kinnaman as Michael Flood
 Maika Monroe  as Grace
 Paul Schneider as Jimmy
 Ryan Phillippe as Charley Flood
 Felix Scott as Phil Flood
 James Nelson-Joyce as Leonard
 Antoni Corone as Bono
 Carlos Schram as Carlos
 Tarek Hamite as Ryan

Production
It was announced in May 2018 that Matthias Schoenaerts, Garrett Hedlund and Scoot McNairy were cast to star in the film, which was due to begin filming in August in Philadelphia. In February 2019, it was announced Joel Kinnaman, Ryan Phillippe Paul Schneider and Maika Monroe were also joining.

Filming began by March 2019 in New York City.

Release
The film had its world premiere at the Deauville Film Festival on September 8, 2020. It was previously set to have its world premiere at the Tribeca Film Festival on April 19, 2020, prior to the festival's cancellation due to the COVID-19 pandemic. In November 2020, Vertical Entertainment acquired U.S. distribution rights to the film and released on January 22, 2021

Reception

References

External links
 

Films postponed due to the COVID-19 pandemic
American crime drama films
Films set in Philadelphia
Films shot in New York City
Killer Films films
Vertical Entertainment films
Films produced by Christine Vachon
English-language French films
French crime drama films
English-language Belgian films
Belgian crime drama films
2020 films
2020 crime drama films
English-language Dutch films
Dutch crime drama films
2020s English-language films
2020s American films
2020s French films